Ergny is a commune in the Pas-de-Calais department in the Hauts-de-France region of France.

Geography
A village situated some 14 miles (22 km) northeast of Montreuil-sur-Mer at the D131E3 road.

Population

Places of interest
 The fifteenth century church of Saint Leger

See also
Communes of the Pas-de-Calais department

References

External links

 Ergny on the Quid website 

Communes of Pas-de-Calais